Ahmed Taher Al-Nufaili (born January 11, 1994) is a Saudi football player who plays as a left back.

References 

1994 births
Living people
Saudi Arabian footballers
Hajer FC players
Al-Ain FC (Saudi Arabia) players
Al Omran Club players
Saudi First Division League players
Saudi Professional League players
Saudi Third Division players
Association football fullbacks
Saudi Arabian Shia Muslims